Listening to Kenny G is a 2021 American documentary film, directed by Penny Lane. It is about the jazz musician Kenny G.

Production 
Initially, Bill Simmons, the creator of HBO’s Music Box series, invited Penny Lane to make a music documentary. Lane chose Kenny G as the subject of the film because he is "a musician who is objectively popular, by way of record sales, but is also hated by the 'critical class'." Kenny G himself had no control of the content of the film.

Release 
Listening to Kenny G premiered at the 2021 Toronto International Film Festival. The film will screen at the Hamptons International Film Festival. It aired on HBO as part of Bill Simmons' Music Box anthology. It debuted on December 2, 2021 on HBO and was also available to stream on HBO Max. It was screened as the opening night film at DOC NYC 2021. It was released on December 11, 2021 on Binge in Australia.

Reception
The New Yorker listed Listening to Kenny G as one of the best films of 2021. Richard Brody of The New Yorker wrote, "By listening attentively to Kenny G, Lane delivers, in a buoyant, amiable way, a ferocious denunciation, one in which she herself doesn’t voice a negative word—because he does most of the inadvertent, unconscious damning."

Glenn Kenny of The New York Times wrote, "The movie’s animating question is why a musician who has brought an abundance of pleasure to so many listeners makes so many others almost incoherently angry. Some interviewees, including Kenny G himself, imply that judgments against his work are de facto judgments of the people who love it. That’s a specious conclusion, one which the movie could have unpacked better."

References

External links
 
Listening to Kenny G at Rotten Tomatoes

2021 films
2021 documentary films
HBO documentary films
Documentary films about jazz music and musicians
2020s English-language films
2020s American films
Films directed by Penny Lane